Salma Mahmoud El Said Mohamed (born ) is an Egyptian female artistic gymnast and part of the national team.

She participated at the 2012 Summer Olympics in London, United Kingdom, and the 2009 and 2011 World Artistic Gymnastics Championships.

References

External links

1991 births
Living people
Egyptian female artistic gymnasts
Gymnasts at the 2012 Summer Olympics
Olympic gymnasts of Egypt
Place of birth missing (living people)
21st-century Egyptian women